Karimnagar district is one of the 33 districts of the Indian state of Telangana. Karimnagar city is its administrative headquarters. The district shares boundaries with Peddapalli, Jagityal, Sircilla, Siddipet, Jangaon, Hanamkonda district and Jayashankar Bhupalapally districts.

Etymology 
Karimnagar was originally called Elagandala. Later Kannada kingdoms such as Western Chalukyas ruled it. It was part of the great Satavahana Empire. Later, the ruling Nizams of Hyderabad changed the name to Karimnagar, derived from the name of Shahenshah E Karimnagar Syed Kareemullah Shah Quadrii nithinvasi.

History 

After the districts re-organisation in October 2016, 3 new districts were carved out from the erstwhile Karimnagar district to form three new districts of Jagtial district, Peddapalli district and Rajanna Sircilla district.
Few mandals were merged into other newly formed districts of Warangal Urban, Siddipet, Jayashankar Bhupalpally.

Geography 

Karimnagar is the fifth smallest district in Telangana by area. Karimnagar shares it boundaries with Jagtial to its north, Peddapalli district on north-east, Hanamkonda district towards South, Siddipet district on south-west, Rajanna Sircilla to the West and Jayashankar Bhupalapally on East.

Demographics 

 Census of India, the district has a population of 10,05,711.It has a literacy rate of 69.16% and density of 423 persons per km2., making it fifth most literate and densely populated district among 31 districts of Telangana. Total urban population of the district is 3,08,984, which is 30.72% of total population. It has a single municipal corporation (Karimnagar) and four municipalities under the new municipalities act (Huzurabad, Jammikunta, Choppadandi and Kothapalli). The population of the Satavahana Urban Development Authority has a population of over 4,80,000 in Karimnagar and its urban agglomeration.

Administrative divisions 

The district is divided into two revenue divisions of Karimnagar and Huzurabad. These are sub-divided into sixteen mandals. There are 210 revenue villages and 276 Gram-Panchyats in the district. R.V Karnan is the present collector of the district.

Mandals 

The below table categorizes 16 mandals into their respective revenue divisions in the district:

Economy 

Granite industry of the district include, Tan Brown and Maple Red variety of granite. In Karimnagar district, there are over 600 stone quarries spread over several mandals such as Karimnagar, Manakondur, Mallial, Kesavapatnam etc.

In 2006, the Indian government named undivided Karminagar district as one of the country's 250 most impoverished districts (out of 640). It is one of the nine earlier integrated districts in Telangana currently receiving funds from the Backward Regions Grant Fund Programme (BRGF).

Notable people 
 P. V. Narasimha Rao, Former Prime Minister of India
Vidyasagar Rao, Honourable Maharashtra Governor
 Dr. C. Narayana Reddy, writer, Jnanpith Award recipient.
 Justice N. Kumarayya, Retired Chief Justice of Andhra Pradesh & ex-judge, World Bank Administrative Tribunal
 Midde Ramulu (Oggu Katha artist from Hanmajipet village)
 Anabheri Prabhakar Rao, Freedom Fighter and Telangana Rebellion Martyr
 Mallojula Koteswara Rao
 G. Ram Reddy, architect of distance education and the father of open learning in India.
 Paidi Jairaj, film actor, director and producer. He was recipient of Dadasaheb Phalke Award for lifetime achievement in 1980.
 Siva Reddy, popular Telugu language comedian and actor.
 Naveen Deshaboina, Indian film director born in Manakondur

See also 
 List of districts in Telangana
 Gattubhoothkur
 Moqdumpur

References

External links 

 Karimnagar District website

 
Coal mining districts in India

hi:करीमनगर